The Free State of Schaumburg-Lippe was created following the abdication of Prince Adolf II of Schaumburg-Lippe on 15 November 1918, following the  German Revolution. It was a state in Germany during the Weimar Republic and Nazi Germany. The democratic government was suppressed during Nazi rule. At the end of the Second World War, the British military occupation government decreed on 1 November 1946 the union of Schaumburg-Lippe, Hannover, Braunschweig and Oldenburg to form the new state of Lower Saxony.

Government 
The state parliament consisted of a landtag of 15 members elected for a term of three years by universal suffrage. The state administration, headed by a Staatsrat (State Councillor), was responsible to the landtag and could be removed by a vote of no confidence. For most of the Weimar period, the state coalition governments usually were headed by a Social Democrat or a non-partisan technocrat.

Following their seizure of power at the national level, the Nazi government embarked on a policy of Gleichschaltung (coordination) by which they intended to eliminate any potential sources of opposition in the states. On 9 March 1933, they appointed a Nazi Reichskommissar to take direct control of police functions in Schaumburg-Lippe, provoking the resignation of the SPD-led coalition government.

The Reich government next enacted the "Provisional Law on the Coordination of the States with the Reich" on 31 March 1933. This mandated that all the sitting state landtage be dissolved and reconstituted on the basis of the recent  5 March Reichstag election results. By this means, the Nazi Party secured a working majority in the Schaumburg-Lippe landtag and installed Hans-Joachim Riecke as the head of government on 1 April. On 7 April, the Reich government enacted the "Second Law on the Coordination of the States with the Reich" that established more direct control over the states by means of the new powerful position of Reichsstatthalter (Reich Governor). Alfred Meyer, the Nazi Party Gauleiter for Gau Westphalia-North, was installed in this new post for both Schaumburg-Lippe and Lippe on 16 May 1933.

By the provisions of the "Law on the Reconstruction of the Reich" of 31 January 1934, all state landtage were abolished and the sovereignty of the states was passed to the Reich government. With that, Schaumburg-Lippe effectively lost its rights as a federal state, though it continued to exist as an administrative unit of the Reich until the fall of the Nazi regime.

After the war, Schaumburg-Lippe was part of the British occupation zone. It lost its status as a separate German state when it was merged into the newly founded state of Lower Saxony on 1 November 1946, which subsequently became a part of West Germany upon its establishment in May 1949.

Government Leaders

Minister of State
 Friedrich Freiherr von Feilitzsch (15 November 1918 – 3 December 1918)

Chairman of the State Council
 Heinrich Lorenz (SPD, 4 December 1918 – 14 March 1919)

State Councillors
 Otto Bömers (non-partisan, 14 March 1919 – 22 May 1922)
 Konrad Wippermann (non-partisan, 22 May 1922 – 28 May 1925)
 Erich Steinbrecher (SPD, 28 May 1925 – 7 October 1927)
 Heinrich Lorenz (SPD, 7 October 1927 – 7 March 1933)
 Hans-Joachim Riecke (NSDAP, 1 April – 23 May 1933)

State President
 Karl Dreier (NSDAP, 25 May 1933 – 8 April 1945)

Reichsstatthalter
 Alfred Meyer (NSDAP, 16 May 1933 – 11 April 1945)

State Councillors
 Heinrich Bövers (non-partisan, May 1945 – 15 Jun 1945)
 Heinrich Hermann Drake (SPD, 15 Jun 1945 – 30 Apr 1946)
 Heinrich Bövers (non-partisan, 30 Apr 1946 – 9 Dec 1946)

See also 
 Schaumburg-Lippe Landtag elections in the Weimar Republic

References

External links 
Schaumburg-Lippe
States of Germany since 1918

1918 establishments in Germany
1946 disestablishments in Germany
Former republics
Former states and territories of Lower Saxony
Schaumburg-Lippe